Peter Chaba (May 23, 1903 – March 29, 1964) was a provincial politician from Alberta, Canada. He served as a member of the Legislative Assembly of Alberta from 1948 to 1955, sitting with the Social Credit caucus in government.

References

Alberta Social Credit Party MLAs
Ukrainian emigrants to Canada
Austro-Hungarian emigrants to Canada
Ukrainian Austro-Hungarians
People from the Kingdom of Galicia and Lodomeria
People from Ternopil Oblast
1964 deaths
1903 births